Domingo Alberto Sánchez (born 5 November 1972) is an Argentine football manager and former player.

Sánchez was a Defensa y Justicia youth graduate, but spent the most of his senior career in Bolivia. After retiring he became a manager, and managed mostly in the Copa Simón Bolívar and regional leagues. In the Bolivian Primera División, he was in charge of Destroyers in 2007, Real Mamoré in 2011, and San José for two periods in 2021.

References

External links

1972 births
Living people
Argentine footballers
Defensa y Justicia footballers
Guabirá players
Club Independiente Petrolero players
Argentine expatriate footballers
Argentine expatriate sportspeople in Bolivia
Expatriate footballers in Bolivia
Argentine football managers
Bolivian Primera División managers
Club Destroyers managers
Club San José managers
Argentine expatriate football managers
Expatriate football managers in Bolivia
Association footballers not categorized by position